Selke-Aue is a municipality in the district of Harz, in Saxony-Anhalt, Germany. It was formed on 1 January 2010 by the merger of the former municipalities Hausneindorf, Heteborn and Wedderstedt.

References